Ulrike Priller-Dressler (born 6 January 1973) is an Austrian former professional tennis player.

Priller reached a career best ranking of 182 in the world and won four ITF titles.

Her best performance on the WTA Tour was a second round appearance at Brisbane in 1990, which she followed up by making it through to the final qualifying round for the Australian Open.

ITF finals

Singles: 6 (4–2)

References

External links
 
 

1973 births
Living people
Austrian female tennis players
20th-century Austrian women
21st-century Austrian women